Paul Scott Janus is a former player in the National Football League. He played with the Carolina Panthers during the 1998 NFL season. The following year, he was a member of the Detroit Lions, but did not see any playing time during the regular season.

References

External links
Just Sports Stats

Sportspeople from Janesville, Wisconsin
Players of American football from Wisconsin
Carolina Panthers players
Detroit Lions players
Chicago Enforcers players
Northwestern Wildcats football players
1975 births
Living people